The 2010 Copa Libertadores de América (officially the 2010 Copa Santander Libertadores for sponsorship reasons) was the 51st edition of the Copa Libertadores de América, CONMEBOL's premier international club tournament. The tournament began on January 26 and ended on August 18. During the month of June, the competition was interrupted after the conclusion of the quarterfinals due to the 2010 FIFA World Cup in South Africa.

Estudiantes were the defending champion, but they were eliminated by Brazilian team Internacional in the quarterfinals.

Internacional won the competition after defeating Guadalajara in both legs of the finals for their second Copa Libertadores title. Internacional qualified for both the 2010 FIFA Club World Cup and the 2011 Recopa Sudamericana.

Qualified teams
The qualified teams include the 37 teams who qualified from their league positions and the defending champion Estudiantes of Argentina, plus Mexican clubs Guadalajara and San Luis. Those two Mexican clubs were guaranteed placement in the Round of 16, independent of the other three Mexican clubs, due to the fallout of the H1N1 flu outbreak in Mexico during the 2009 Copa Libertadores. Twenty-six teams qualified directly to the Second Stage, a group stage:
 Berths 1 to 4 from Argentina and Brazil;
 Berths 1 and 2 from the remaining eight South American football associations and Mexico.
The other 12 teams enter the competition in the First Stage, an elimination play-off stage where the winners advance to the Second Stage:
 Berths 5 and 6 from Argentina;
 Berth 5 from Brazil;
 Berth 3 from the remaining eight South American nations and Mexico.

Round and draw dates
The calendar shows the dates of the rounds and draw. All events occurred in 2010 unless otherwise stated. Dates in italics are only reference dates for the week the matches are to be played.

Tie-breaking criteria
At each stage of the tournament teams receive 3 points for a win, 1 point for a draw, and no points for a loss. Based on Article 15 in the CONMEBOL regulations, if two or more teams are equal on points, the following criteria will be applied to determine the ranking in the group stage:

superior goal difference;
higher number of goals scored;
higher number of away goals scored;
draw.

In the first stage, third stage, quarterfinals, and semifinals, a penalty shootout is carried out instead of a draw.

First stage

In the First Stage, twelve teams played two-legged ties (one game at home and one game away) against another opponent. The winner of each tie advanced to the Second Stage. Team #1 played the second leg at home.

Second stage

The draw for the second stage was held at the CONMEBOL Conventions Center in Luque, Paraguay on November 27, 2009. Twenty-eight teams were drawn into eight groups with the remaining six spots to be taken by the winners from the first stage. Teams were divided into four pots; the top four Argentine and Brazilian berths were top seeds in the group stage.

In each group, teams played against each other home-and-away. The top team in each group and the top six second-placed team advanced to the Round of 16.

Group 1

Group 2

Group 3

Group 4

Group 5

Group 6

Group 7

Group 8

Ranking of second-placed teams

Knockout stages

The last four stages of the tournament (third stage, quarterfinals, semifinals, and finals) form a single-elimination tournament, commonly known as a knockout stage. Fourteen teams will qualify for the knockout competition: the eight group winners, the six group runners-up teams with the best records plus Mexican clubs Guadalajara and San Luis. In each tie, the team with the higher seed will play at home in the second leg. In addition, each club will be able to submit a new squad with up to three player changes 24 hours before the start of their first third stage match.

Seeding
The 16 qualified teams were seeded according to their results in the Second Stage. The top teams from each group were seeded 1–8, with the team with the most points as seed 1 and the team with the least as seed 8. The second-best teams from each group were seeded 9–16, with the team with the most points as seed 9 and the team with the least as seed 16. Guadalajara and San Luis were given the 13 and 14 seed, respectively, which they had earned in the 2009 Copa Libertadores.

Bracket

Round of 16
The first match of the Round of 16 began on April 27, with the last match played on May 6. Team #1, as the higher seeded team, played the second leg at home.

Quarter-finals
The first leg of the quarter-finals took place the week of May 12, while the second leg took place the week of May 19. Team #1, as the higher seeded team, played the second leg at home.

Semi-finals
After a six-week break because of the 2010 FIFA World Cup, the first leg of the Copa Libertadores semi-finals took place the week of July 28, while the second leg took place the week of August 5.

|}

Finals

In the finals, if the finalists are tied on points after the culmination of the second leg, the winner will be the team with the best goal difference. If they are tied on goal difference, the game will move onto extra time and a penalty shootout if necessary. The away goals rule does not apply in this stage. As the last CONMEBOL team in the competition, Internacional has qualified to the 2010 FIFA Club World Cup, regardless of the results. 

Internacional won the Copa Libertadores on aggregate 5-3.

Statistics

Top goalscorers

Player of the week

See also
2010 Copa Sudamericana
2011 Recopa Sudamericana
2010 FIFA Club World Cup

Footnotes

A. Estudiantes, as the defending champion, take the Argentina 1 berth. Therefore the teams with the lowest two berths enter the First Stage

References
General

Specific

External links
CONMEBOL Official Website
Soccernet 2010 Copa Libertadores on ESPN
Soccerway 2010 Copa Libertadores coverage
South American Futbol Copa Libertadores News Website

 
2010
1